Sporthalle Augsburg is an indoor arena located in Augsburg, Germany. Completed in 1965, it hosted six team handball matches for the 1972 Summer Olympics in neighboring Munich.

References
 1972 Summer Olympics official report. Volume 1. Part 1. p. 121.
 1972 Summer Olympics official report. Volume 3. p. 375.
 Augsburg.de profile 

Venues of the 1972 Summer Olympics
Indoor arenas in Germany
Olympic handball venues
Buildings and structures in Augsburg
Sports venues in Bavaria
Sports venues completed in 1965